Colin Parry (16 February 1941 – 13 August 2020) was an English professional footballer who played as a central defender.

Career
Born in Stockport, Parry played for Vernon Park, Stockport County, Bradford City, Rochdale, Macclesfield Town and Morecambe.

He was on loan at Bradford City from Stockport County between September and October 1965, making 5 league appearances for the club.

He died on 13 August 2020.

Sources

References

1941 births
2020 deaths
English footballers
Stockport County F.C. players
Bradford City A.F.C. players
Rochdale A.F.C. players
Macclesfield Town F.C. players
Morecambe F.C. players
English Football League players
Association football defenders